Michael Gavin (born March 30, 1986 in Scottsdale, Arizona) is an American soccer player, currently without a team.

Career

Youth, College and Amateur
Gavin attended Horizon High School in Scottsdale, Arizona, with whom he won the 2003 State Championship while being was named Defensive Player of the Year and to the all-area first-team. Gavin also played club soccer for the Sereno Golden Eagles youth club with fellow MLS players Brandon McDonald, Robbie Findley and Rob Valentino.

Gavin played college soccer at the University of Portland from 2004 to 2007. While playing for the Pilots, Gavin was named West Coast Conference Freshman of the Year and Most Outstanding Defensive Player of the Nike Portland Invitational in 2004, and made significant contributions to the Pilots on-field successes, starting over 50 games and scoring five goals.

During his college years Gavin spent two years with the Bradenton Academics of the USL Premier Development League, and was also a member of the Arizona State Olympic Development Team.

Professional
Gavin was the 4th overall pick in the 2008 MLS Supplemental Draft, selected by the Los Angeles Galaxy. He made his MLS debut in Galaxy's first match of the 2008 season against Colorado Rapids on March 29, 2008, but never found a regular starting spot on the team. He was released by the club in February 2009, having made just two MLS appearances.

Personal
Michael is the older brother of midfielder Blair Gavin.

External links

Portland Pilots bio

1986 births
Living people
American soccer players
Association football defenders
IMG Academy Bradenton players
LA Galaxy draft picks
LA Galaxy players
Major League Soccer players
Portland Pilots men's soccer players
Soccer players from Scottsdale, Arizona
United States men's under-23 international soccer players
USL League Two players